The International Institute of Information Technology, Pune (I2IT, pronounced as I Square IT, Pune), is a private institute located at Rajiv Gandhi Infotech Park, Hinjawadi, in Pune, Maharashtra, India. The institute is affiliated to Savitribai Phule Pune University formerly known as University of Pune and is approved by All India Council for Technical Education (AICTE), New Delhi, and is recognized by Directorate of Technical Education (DTE), Govt. of Maharashtra (Institute code – 6754). The institute offers four-year degree program in engineering in three domains: computer science, information technology, and electronics & telecommunication.

History 
In the late 1990s, to control the outflux of graduates as well as to reduce if not crush the brain drain to US and European countries, Mr. P. P. Chhabria, then the president of MCCI (A). Shri P P Chhabria sought advice from scientists like Padma Bhushan, Dr. R. A. Mashelkar and Padma Shri Dr Vijay P Bhatkar, who have been closely associated with this institute over the years. On 28 May 2003, Bharat Ratna Dr. A. P. J. Abdul Kalam, the former President of India, visited I2IT and dedicated this institute to the service of the nation.

Academics 
Programs offered are as follows:

Department of Computer Science
Department of Information Technology
Department of Electronics & Telecommunication Engineering

Campus life 
Several facilities are offered on campus:
 Infrastructure
 Cafeteria
 Central Computing Facility
 Hostel Facility
 Library Facility
 Sports and Recreational Facilities

References 

Engineering colleges in Pune
Colleges affiliated to Savitribai Phule Pune University
Educational institutions established in 2003
2003 establishments in India